Abdul Waheed (30 November 1936 – 21 February 2022), also known as Abdul Waheed Khan, born in the British Raj, was a Pakistani field hockey player who was a member of the country's gold medal winning 1960 Olympic Hockey team.
He played center forward, and scored the first goal in the team's final game.

In September 2000, Abdul Waheed was interviewed to see  the changes in the views of Olympic athletes since his team won the gold medal: 
 He died in Karachi on 21 February 2022, at the age of 85.

References

External links
 

1936 births
2022 deaths
Pakistani male field hockey players
Olympic field hockey players of Pakistan
Olympic gold medalists for Pakistan
Olympic medalists in field hockey
Medalists at the 1960 Summer Olympics
Field hockey players at the 1960 Summer Olympics
Asian Games medalists in field hockey
Field hockey players at the 1962 Asian Games
Field hockey players at the 1966 Asian Games
Asian Games gold medalists for Pakistan
Asian Games silver medalists for Pakistan
Medalists at the 1962 Asian Games
Medalists at the 1966 Asian Games
20th-century Pakistani people